Stretton is a southern suburb in the City of Brisbane, Queensland, Australia.

Geography 

The northern part of Stretton includes several hills, but the land flattens out towards the south. The southern part has more vegetation, as it joins Karawatha Forest to the south-east and the Calamvale Creek wetlands on the south-west.

History 
In the early 19th century, the area and many of today's suburbs around the Sunnybank area were part of a vast area known as Coopers Plains. In 1861, Governor Bowen declared a wide area that included Eight Mile Plains to Stretton as a Brisbane Agricultural Reserve. This agricultural reserve was originally used as a source of timber, but when it was found to be good farming land, settlers quickly turned it into farms that produced sought-after fruit, vegetables, and poultry.

A military map from 1922 shows only four houses in the area that is now Stretton.

Stretton was gazetted as a suburb of Brisbane in 1972, and was named after George Stretton, a settler, postmaster and hotelier at Browns Plains in the 1870s.

In 1989, there was controversy regarding the sale of land to Asian investors, and there is a large Asian population in the suburb today. 

With rare exceptions, the dwellings in Stretton are stand-alone houses – generally modern, brick and tile. Houses in the north-west corner of Stretton include many huge, multi-storey mansions.

Stretton State College opened on 1 January 2006.

The median age was 36 years, 1 year below the Australian median. 41.6% were born in Australia, compared to the national average of 69.8%. The next most common countries of birth were China 7.1%, Taiwan 7%, New Zealand 4.1%, Hong Kong 4% and India 3.1%. 41.4% of people spoke only English at home. The next most popular languages were 16.2% Mandarin, 11.3% Cantonese, 3.3% Vietnamese, 2.9% Hindi and 2.4% Korean. The weekly median household income in Stretton was $1,843, compared to the national median of $1,234. This difference is also reflected in real estate, with the median mortgage payment being $2,400 per month, compared to the national median of $1,800.

Education 
Stretton State College is a government primary and secondary (Prep-12) school for boys and girls at 226 Illaweena Street. In 2018, the school had an enrolment of 2,590 students with 196 teachers (180 full-time equivalent) and 101 non-teaching staff (71 full-time equivalent). It includes a special education program.

Facilities 
Stretton is home to Hope Christian Assembly, a multicultural Pentecostal Church affiliated with Australian Christian Churches which holds services at Stretton State College.

In addition to small local shops, Calamvale Village on Kameruka Street and Sunnybank Hills Shopping Centre on Hellawell Road provide basic shopping. Westfield Garden City at Upper Mount Gravatt is a larger shopping centre nearby.

References

External links 
 University of Queensland: Queensland Places: Stretton
 Critters of Calamvale Creek wildlife of Calamvale and Stretton
 
 

Suburbs of the City of Brisbane